Hum Chaar is a 2019 Indian Hindi-language romantic comedy film, which is written and directed by Abhishek Dixit. It is produced by Rajshri Productions. The movie is creatively produced by Sooraj R. Barjatya. Hum Chaar Film is introduced four new faces on screens. Debutantes Prit Kamani, Simran Sharma, Anshuman Malhotra and Tushar Pandey. The film was Rajshri Productions' (P) Ltd's 58th film.

Synopsis 
It is said that friends are the family we choose. Hum Chaar depicts this concept through nostalgic and relatable story telling. Hum Chaar is a story about the emotional bond shared by four main characters Namit, Manjari, Abeer and Surjo, who start out as friends in college and end up becoming each other’s family.

While Manjari is definitely a new-age Rajshri heroine, she isn't unaffected by the patriarchy and tradition.

She is focused on becoming a doctor so she isn't married off by her conservative father and brother.

Her strong, independent and fearless nature fascinates the three boys and the four become great friends.

But over time all three boys discover that they are in love with Manjari and confess their feelings to each other. On her birthday, the trio decides to find out who, out of the three, is she actually in love with. But some boys take a video as the trio confesses their love while Manjari is drunk. Manjari replies, drunken, that she loves all three. In the morning, she does not appear to remember anything and leaves. The video is posted on YouTube and the trio fights the boy who posted the video, beats him up, and is shown that a chemical falls on him. The trio then fight each other and break up. Hum Chaar is a story that revolves around that idea and explores the gravity of the fact that in modern times friends are family too.

Cast 
 Prit Kamani as Namit
 Simran Sharma as Manjari Mishra
 Anshuman Malhotra as Abeer
 Tushar Pandey as Surjo
Himanshu Ashok Malhotra as Aarambh
Veebha Aanand as Savita
 Jatin Goswami as Ravikant
Alok Pandey as Vikram Yadav

Production 
The film was announced by Rajshri Productions on 12 November 2018, on the third anniversary of their last release, Prem Ratan Dhan Payo.

Soundtrack 

The music of the film was composed by 
Team SARA, Vipin Patwa, George Joseph and Raaj Aashoo with lyrics written by Shabbir Ahmed and Abhishek Dixit. The film's score was composed by George Joseph.

References

External links 

 
 

2019 romantic comedy-drama films
2010s musical comedy-drama films
2010s romantic musical films
Indian romantic musical films
Films scored by Vipin Patwa
2010s Hindi-language films
Films set in Mumbai
2019 films
Films shot in Mauritius
Indian romantic comedy-drama films
Indian musical comedy-drama films
Films shot at Ramoji Film City
2019 comedy films
2019 drama films